MV China Star (中华之星) is the world's largest ship with a SWATH design, and the only twin-hull cruise ship ever built. It was sold and has operated in Hong Kong as the gambling ship Asia Star for Asia Cruises beginning in 2005, and the ship was later renamed China Star and was operated by several operators. The ship is currently laid up in Shenzhen, China. This 350-passenger all balcony luxury cruise ship was the largest SWATH ship in the world when it was built, displacing more than 20,000 tons. Originally known as the Radisson Diamond, the ship was built for Diamond Cruise, a conglomerate of several Finnish banks and the UKL-based Carlson Companies (the parent company of Radisson Cruises and Hotels). The ship was built at the Finnish Rauma shipyard by STX Finland.

In June 2011, the ship was purchased for $45M by China Cruises Company Limited, the deal being led by Chinese millionaire entrepreneur Huang Weijian, CEO of CCCL. Another $20M was spent refurbishing her. Operation started on March 9, 2012, as the first ship of the new CCCL luxury cruise line.

References

External links

 China Cruises Company Limited
 Independent professional photographs from shipspotting.com

Cruise ships
1991 ships
Ships built in Rauma, Finland